Hamilton Bulldogs may refer to:

 Hamilton Bulldogs (AHL), former professional ice hockey team from Hamilton, Ontario that played in the American Hockey League from 1996 to 2015.
 Hamilton Bulldogs (OHL), current major junior ice hockey team from Hamilton, Ontario that began play in the Ontario Hockey League for the 2015–16 season.